"Un bacio piccolissimo" is a 1964 song composed by  Giovanni Ornati and Gino Mescoli. The song premiered at the 14th edition of the Sanremo Music Festival with a double performance of Robertino and Bobby Rydell. Robertino's version was sung with a fake English accent according to the fashion of the time.
 
Both Robertino's and Rydell's versions were successful, respectively ranking #4 and #9 on the Italian hit parade.

The song was later recorded also in Spanish (with the title "Un beso pequenisimo") and in German (with the title "Heute Abend lass die Uhr zu Haus").  In 2016 thecomedy music group  Elio e le Storie Tese, with the participation as spoken voice of adult actor Rocco Siffredi, presented a new version of the song at the 63rd edition of the Sanremo Music Festival.

Track listing

 7" single –  CI 20103 
 "Un bacio piccolissimo"  (Giovanni Ornati, Gino Mescoli)
 "Se saprai" (Giuseppe Paiocchi, Gino Mescoli, Vito Pallavicini)

Charts

References

 

Songs about kissing
1964 singles
Italian songs
1964 songs
Sanremo Music Festival songs